Amphicynodontidae is a probable clade of extinct arctoids. While some researchers consider this group to be an extinct subfamily of bears, a variety of morphological evidence links amphicynodontines with pinnipeds, as the group were semi-aquatic otter-like mammals. In addition to the support of the pinniped–amphicynodontine clade, other morphological and some molecular analyses support bears being the closest living relatives to pinnipeds. According to McKenna and Bell (1997) Amphicynodontinae are classified as stem-pinnipeds in the superfamily Phocoidea. Fossils of these mammals have been found in Europe, North America and Asia. Amphicynodontines should not be confused with Amphicyonids (bear-dogs), a separate family of Carnivora which is a sister clade to arctoids within the caniforms, but which may be listed as a clade of extinct arctoids in older publications.

Systematics
 Subfamily †Amphicynodontinae Simpson, 1945
 †Amphicticeps Matthew and Granger, 1924
 †Amphicticeps makhchinus Wang et al., 2005
 †Amphicticeps dorog Wang et al., 2005
 †Amphicticeps shackelfordi Matthew and Granger, 1924
 †Parictis Scott, 1893
 †Parictis primaevus Scott, 1893
 †Parictis personi Chaffee, 1954
 †Parictis montanus Clark & Guensburg, 1972
 †Parictis parvus Clark & Beerbower, 1967
 †Parictis gilpini Clark & Guensburg, 1972
 †Parictis dakotensis Clark, 1936
 †Kolponomos Stirton, 1960
 †Kolponomos newportensis Tedford et al., 1994
 †Kolponomos clallamensis Stirton, 1960
 †Allocyon Merriam, 1930
 †Allocyon loganensis Merriam, 1930
 †Pachycynodon Schlosser, 1888
 †Pachycynodon tedfordi Wang & Qiu, 2003
 †Pachycynodon tenuis Teilhard de Chardin, 1915
 †Pachycynodon filholi Schlosser, 1888
 †Pachycynodon boriei (Filhol, 1876)
 †Pachycynodon crassirostris Schlosser, 1888
 †Amphicynodon Filhol, 1881
 †Amphicynodon mongoliensis Janovskaja, 1970
 †Amphicynodon teilhardi Matthew and Granger, 1924
 †Amphicynodon typicus Schlosser, 1888
 †Amphicynodon chardini Cirot and De Bonis, 1992
 †Amphicynodon cephalogalinus Teilhard, 1915
 †Amphicynodon gracilis (Filhol, 1874)
 †Amphicynodon crassirostris (Filhol, 1876)
 †Amphicynodon brachyrostris (Filhol, 1876)
 †Amphicynodon leptorhynchus (Filhol, 1874)
 †Amphicynodon velaunus (Aymard, 1846)

References

Miocene carnivorans